The Ring Two is a 2005 American psychological supernatural horror film and sequel to the 2002 film The Ring, which was a remake of the 1998 Japanese film Ring. Hideo Nakata, director of Ring, on which the American versions are based, directed this film in place of Gore Verbinski. Noam Murro was attached before Nakata, but left due to creative differences.

The film was shot in Astoria, Oregon and Los Angeles, California. The Ring Two was released theatrically on March 18, 2005, and although it was met by generally negative critical reception, it opened in the United States with a strong $35 million its first weekend, more than doubling the opening weekend of The Ring. Its final $76 million domestic gross was less than the original's $129 million, but it took $87 million internationally, for a total gross of $164 million.

It is the second installment of the American Ring series, and was followed by Rings (2017).

Plot 
Six months after the events of the first film and immediately following the events of the short film Rings, Samara Morgan's cursed videotape has been circulating among teenagers in Astoria, Oregon. Jake Pierce is on his seventh day as per the tape's rules, and asks his friend, Emily, to watch the tape. He briefly steps into his kitchen, while Emily supposedly watches the tape. Jake receives a phone call, and initially thinks it is Samara, but is relieved to realize it is only his friend, with whom he had planned to trick Emily into watching the tape. Suddenly, Jake notices dark liquid pouring from under the kitchen door, and runs outside to the living room, only to discover Emily got scared, and closed her eyes while watching the tape. Jake is then promptly murdered by Samara.

Rachel and Aidan have moved to Astoria from Seattle after sending the tape off into the ether. Rachel works at The Daily Astorian for the editor, Max Rourke. Rachel learns of Jake's death, inspecting his body, only for Samara to appear, declaring that she has been looking for her. Rachel breaks into Jake's house, obtains the videotape, and burns it. Aidan experiences a nightmare, where Samara drags him into a television. He soon starts developing hypothermia and bruises on his arms. At a county fair, Aidan wanders into a restroom, and takes photographs of his reflection, where Samara appears. Rachel takes him home, but they are attacked by multiple wild deer on the way, wrecking the car. After the stampede, Rachel returns home with Aidan, and worries about his health. It is during this time that Rachel realizes that Aidan may be possessed by Samara.

Deciding to not be alone in their home, they rush to the Daily Astorian, surprising her co-workers, including Max. Rachel then asks for his help, claiming to have lost power, so Max takes them in. While Rachel is attempting to give Aidan a bath, he develops an irrational fear of water. Samara causes the water to recede from the bath, replacing Aidan with herself, and terrorizing Rachel so that she tries to drown Samara. Max enters, seeing her drowning Aidan instead, and forces her to take him to the hospital. Whilst Aidan is sleeping, he telepathically sends Rachel a vision from Samara consisting of many different images. Rachel is left with many questions about Samara's origins.

Based on Aidan's bruises and his health, CPS is called. Psychiatrist Emma Temple shows up, and concludes that Rachel is abusing Aidan. Rachel doesn't want to talk, but Emma reveals her knowledge of Rachel's bout with postpartum depression. Thinking that Rachel was the one harming Aidan, Emma bans Rachel from seeing him until they can speak about it in depth.

Looking for answers, Rachel tries to find out who Samara's birth parents were from an adoption agency, but this just directs her back to the Morgans. Rachel returns to the Morgan ranch on Moesko Island. She is all set to break in, until she learns that a real estate agent, Martin, is holding an open house, and she arrives early. Martin lies about what happened to the Morgans, but reveals that any furniture they left behind was sent down to the basement. She heads down there, and finds the mirror from the tape, many deer antlers, Samara's old toy merry-go-round, and a suitcase with a small flower on it. Inside the case is evidence of Samara's biological mother.

While Rachel looks for answers, Samara takes control of Aidan's body, waking him up from sleep. The nurses call Emma in to speak with him, and while they talk, Samara telepathically forces Emma to commit suicide.

Rachel heads to a church, and learns that Samara's biological mother was named Evelyn, who showed up with no father in sight. It is also recorded that she tried to drown Samara as an infant, and was subsequently committed to a psychiatric hospital. When Rachel goes to visit, Evelyn is expecting her, and she is allowed immediate entry to the facility. Evelyn advises her cryptically that: "dreams are safe", that "my baby told me to kill her", and that Rachel "let the dead get in". As Rachel leaves, she asks what to do, and Evelyn replies, "listen to your baby".

Unbeknownst to Rachel, Aidan has left the hospital, and returned to Max's house. Max arrives, and, suspecting foul play, tries to secretly take photos of Aidan. When Rachel returns, an affectionate Aidan greets her, his behaviour seeming out-of-character. She steps out, and finds Max's corpse in his pickup truck. When Rachel falls asleep, she dreams of Aidan, who tells her that she will have to exorcise Samara. When she wakes up, Rachel drugs Aidan/Samara with sleeping pills, and puts Aidan's possessed body in the bath, temporarily drowning Aidan in order to exorcise her. Samara leaves Aidan's body, but appears in the television. Rachel allows herself to be dragged into Samara's monochromatic world, while Aidan pleads with her not to go.

Finding herself in the bottom of the well Samara died in, Rachel discovers the lid is partially open. Rachel scales the well's walls, pursued by Samara, who contorts her body to follow her. Rachel escapes by climbing out, and pushing the lid shut on Samara, permanently locking Samara out of her and Aidan's lives. Rachel wanders through the woods, and begins to hear Aidan's voice. Eventually she comes to the cliff where Anna committed suicide. Rachel cries before closing her eyes, still hearing Aidan's voice. She looks down into the water, then closes her eyes, and jumps. In this way, she is able to return to the real world, and reunites with Aidan, and believes that their ordeal is finally over.

Cast

Critical reception 
On the review aggregator website Rotten Tomatoes, the film has an approval rating of 20% based on 189 reviews, with an average rating of 4.44/10. The site's critical consensus states: "Ring Two serves up horror clichés, and not even Hideo Nakata, the director of the film from which this one is based, can save Ring Two from a dull screenplay full of absurdities". Metacritic assigned the film a weighted average score of 44 out of 100 based on 37 critics, indicating "mixed or average reviews". Audiences polled by CinemaScore gave the film an average grade of "C+" on an A+ to F scale.

Roger Ebert considered it better than the first film, giving it 2½ stars: "The charm of The Ring Two, while limited, is real enough; it is based on the film's ability to make absolutely no sense, while nevertheless generating a real enough feeling of tension a good deal of the time".

Audiences polled by CinemaScore gave the film an average grade of "C+" on an A+ to F scale.

Home media 
In the unrated edition DVD release, a few extra scenes were included that were not in the theatrical release. These scenes include conversations with Rachel's new neighbor (and neighborhood gossip), numerous additions in which Max shows a romantic interest in Rachel, more scenes with Samara prior to her possession of Aidan (including one in which she is shown to enter him in the restroom at the local fair), and an extended opening scene. However, A scene in the theatrical cut in which Aidan first encounters a deer while wandering the local fair (prior to the deer attack) has been removed from this version. The scene when the power went out was changed with a scene of the lights in Aidan's room going on and off, as well as the oven downstairs catching fire. Also, some musical cues were changed such as when Samara leaps out of the well in the opening scene.  

The short film Rings (2005) (which was also included on a special edition of The Ring released just before The Ring Two arrived in theaters) is included with the unrated dvd. A Blu-ray version of the film has yet to be released in the United States. The film officially debuted on Blu-ray in October 26, 2012, in Japan, containing all the extras from the DVD and including the Unrated Cut.

References

External links 
 
 
 
 

2005 films
2000s English-language films
2000s ghost films
2000s psychological horror films
2000s supernatural horror films
2005 horror films
American films about revenge
American ghost films
American mystery films
American psychological horror films
American sequel films
American supernatural horror films
Asian-American horror films
DreamWorks Pictures films
Films about journalists
Films about nightmares
Films about spirit possession
Films directed by Hideo Nakata
Films produced by Walter F. Parkes
Films set in Astoria, Oregon
Films set in Oregon
Films shot in Astoria, Oregon
Films shot in Oregon
Films shot in California
Films shot in Los Angeles
Films with screenplays by Ehren Kruger
The Ring (franchise)
Techno-horror films
2000s American films
2000s Japanese films